The Undersea World of Jacques Cousteau is an American documentary television series about underwater marine life, directed by Alan Landsburg and hosted by French filmmaker, researcher, and marine explorer Jacques Cousteau. The first episodes of the series aired from 1968 until 1976. The English-language narration was by Richard Johnson (BBC version) and Rod Serling (ABC edition). It also featured his sons JeanMichel and Philippe, and his grandson Fabien. Jacques' wife, Simone Melchior, worked on board ship, and dived too, but she did not appear on-screen.

Episodes

References

External links

1968 American television series debuts
1975 American television series endings
1960s American documentary television series
1970s American documentary television series
Nature educational television series
Television series about mammals
Television series by 20th Century Fox Television
Jacques Cousteau